The Chevrolet K5 Blazer is a full-size sport-utility vehicle that was built by General Motors. GM's smallest full-size SUV, it is part of the Chevrolet C/K truck family. Introduced to the Chevrolet line for the 1969 model year, the K5 Blazer was replaced for 1995 by the Chevrolet Tahoe. The third generation was simply called "Chevrolet Blazer", without the K5 name. In 1970, GMC introduced its own model of the truck, called the Jimmy, which was discontinued in 1991 and replaced by the Yukon. The "Jimmy" name was chosen to reflect how GM may sound in a similar manner to how Jeep was thought to be a pronunciation of GP in the competing market. Both were short-wheelbase trucks and available with either rear- or four-wheel drive.

The K5 Blazer and Jimmy had "full convertible" removable tops until 1975. For 1976, GM introduced a half-cab design that was less prone to leaks and slightly safer in a roll-over. These half cabs had the convertible top begin a few inches behind the driver/passenger doors and run back to the tailgate.

The Blazer's long-wheelbase relative, with an integrated rear body and doors for second row passengers, is called the Chevrolet Suburban.

1969–1972

The Scout and Bronco were originally aimed at the Jeep CJ series and consequently all three vehicles were much smaller than the K5 Blazer. Because the Blazer was developed from a shortened pickup truck, this innovation both increased interior space and lowered the cost of production by using a shared platform. The Blazer quickly became popular. For the first time, it married the off-road capabilities of competing utility vehicles with "luxury" features like air conditioning and automatic transmissions that routinely were available on pickup trucks.

By 1970, the Blazer was already outselling both of its older rivals. Ford, Dodge, and even Jeep would counter with similar shortened full-size pickups, including the Dodge Ramcharger and Jeep Cherokee, both introduced in 1974, and the revised Ford Bronco (1978).

For its first model year (1969), the K5 Blazer was available with part-time four-wheel drive only. As an option, a removable hardtop or a soft convertible-top could be specified; passenger seats also were optional on the base model. For 1970, a rear-wheel drive model was added, and the truck was also rebadged as the GMC Jimmy.

Mechanical
There were four choices for power plants, matching the contemporaneous pickup truck options: the 250 straight-6, the 292 straight-6, the 307 V8, and the 350 V8.

There was also a choice between a three-speed automatic transmission, the Turbo-Hydramatic TH350, or one of two fully-synchronized manual transmissions: a three-speed, or a four-speed (SM465), which included a "granny gear" low-ratio 6.55:1 first gear. The 350 was offered only with the SM465 or TH350; manual locking front hubs were optional.

The four-wheel drive version had a solid front axle and used leaf springs front and rear. The two-wheel drive version came with independent front suspension and rear trailing arms, both with coil springs. Both versions used drum brakes on all four wheels until 1971, when the entire GM light truck line was fitted with front discs as standard equipment. A tachometer was optional. Two transfer cases were offered: the Dana 20, available only with the manual transmissions, or the NP-205, available with both types of transmissions. The Blazer had  of ground clearance and an approach angle of 35°.

Engines
250 in³ (4.1 L) I6 (1969–1984)
292 in³ (4.8 L) I6 (1970–1971)
307 in³ (5.0 L) V8 (1969–1973)
350 in³ (5.7 L) V8 (1969–1991)

Transfer cases
NP-205 - gear driven part-time four wheel drive
Dana 20 - gear driven part-time four-wheel drive

1973–1991

Overview

For 1973, GM's line of full-size trucks was redesigned and updated; internally, GM named this the "Rounded Line" generation, while the unofficial nickname was "square body". A tilt-steering wheel became optional. Although rear-wheel drive Blazers were manufactured until 1982, the majority sold were four-wheel drive.

The 1973–75 K5 Blazers were equipped with a removable convertible top. In 1976, a half-cab design was introduced and used until 1991.

The second generation K5 models incorporated the rear hatch glass and tailgate into a single unit, which allowed the glass panel to retract inside of the tailgate by use of a manual crank mounted on the tailgate or an electric motor activated by a key-operated switch on the tailgate and a dash-mounted switch. The weight of the large glass panel was rumored to be a liability as the manual crank gears wore prematurely and the electric motor was prone to frequent overheating and subsequent failure. This also included the electric motor drive cable which goes to the window regulator to the motor (similar in design to a speedometer cable), which usually would fail under heavy abuse. Another feature of the K5 Blazer tailgate was the safety switch connected to the electric motor which prevented the rear window from being raised if the tailgate was unlatched.

The smaller S-10 Blazer, based on the compact S-10 pickups, debuted in 1983; the K5 prefix was used until 1991 to avoid confusion with the smaller utility vehicle.

Model changes

Compared to the first generation K5 Blazer, the Rounded Line K5 grew by  overall, on a  longer wheelbase. The styling was refreshed in 1981, mirroring the changes introduced on the 1981 C/K pickups, most visible in the front end with available stacked dual square headlamps and reduced weight.

GM temporarily changed the usual "C/K" designation to "R" and "V" for the 1987 through 1991 model years. This was done to avoid confusion with the GMT400-based Chevrolet C/K pickup trucks, which were introduced in 1988, during the overlap period. Although the GMT400 trucks were introduced in the spring of 1987 as a 1988 model, the K5 Blazer, Suburban, and crew-cab trucks retained the earlier platform until 1991. 

In 1988, four new colors were introduced: Bright Blue Metallic, Forest Green Metallic, Light Mesa Brown Metallic, and Dark Mesa Brown Metallic. More new features for 1988 included a fixed mast antenna in place of the old windshield antenna, a trip odometer as part of the gauge package cluster, and an improved pulse windshield wiper control. Also, helping to reduce air leaks in the doors was a new door handle seal. Also in 1988, General Motors eliminated the "K5" emblems.

In late 1988 for the 1989 model year, the front grille was changed to resemble the squared-off ones used on the GMT400 series of pickups. The 1989 Blazer had new base and up-level grilles, as well as new headlight bezels, body side moldings, and front bumper rub strips. New for 1989 was the introduction of an all-new base coat/clear coat paint.

For the 1990 model year, all Blazers now had a standard rear wheel anti-lock braking system. A new electronic speedometer system, with a 6 digit odometer on the dashboard was also introduced for 1990, along with non-asbestos brake linings. A new brake warning light on the dashboard was also introduced for 1990. The Blazer body also used double sided, galvanized exterior sheet metal. A new option for 1990 was power mirrors. 3 point shoulder harness also become standard for rear passengers. The rear seat arm rest were eliminated from rear seat to make room for shoulder belts and pads were added to the wheel housings. 

For 1991, two new exterior colors, Brilliant Blue and Slate Metallic were offered.

Drivetrain
The K5 Blazer was fitted with a  inline-six as standard through 1984. Available engines included a  inline-six, small-block V8s of 305, 307, 350, or 400 cubic inches (5.0, 5.0, 5.7, and 6.6 liters), and a 6.2 L Detroit Diesel V8. The six-cylinder Blazer was not recommended for towing.

Since 1981 (in the wake of the 1973 Arab Oil Embargo and the 1979 energy crisis), Chevrolet and GMC used the smaller displacement 305s with a 9.2:1 compression ratio. These engines produced nearly as much torque as the 350, giving a similar driving feel. However, these power plants were underpowered and prone to detonation (engine knocking), especially with the electronic spark control module. To achieve the 9.2:1 compression ratio, the cylinder head chambers were smaller, measuring 56 cc instead of 76 cc. After 1987, when throttle-body injection was introduced in the truck engines, the 350 was made the standard power plant.

Corporate 10-bolt axles were upgraded to 30 spline axle shafts from previous 28 spline shafts in 1989. In addition, the standard L05 5.7-liter V-8 now had one serpentine accessory drive belt in place of the older multi-belt accessory drive setup. 1989 was the first year for the NP241 transfer case and also the only year for speedometer cable driven version of the NP241. The 5.7 liter V8 (L05) engine was improved for 1990 with the addition of improved oil control rings, a redesigned rear crankshaft seal, a new camshaft sprocket design, non-asbestos intake manifold gaskets, and heavy-duty intake valves. For 1991, the 700R4 was renamed to the 4L60. The TBI (throttle body injection) system used on the Blazer's standard 5.7 liter V8 had longer throttle shaft bearings, new throttle return springs, and improved fuel mixture distribution.  The 5.7 liter V8 also had new heavy-duty intake valves and powdered metal camshaft sprockets. Standard on all engines was a lighter more powerful 100-amp CS130 alternator. 

(All power and torque figures are pulled from GM factory service manual)

1973–1980 Blazers used the gear-driven part-time NP-205 transfer case (mostly mated to the SM465 manual transmission and some TH350s) or the chain-driven full-time NP-203 transfer case (mated to the TH350 automatic) and DANA-44 front/12-bolt rear axle combination through 1980. Starting in 1981 used the chain-driven NP208 transfer case (NP241 after 1988) with front 10-bolt/rear 10-bolt axle combinations until 1991. There is an overlap of 12-bolt rears into the early 1980s, while the 10-bolt front axle was phased into production in the late 1970s.

1992–1994

In 1991, for the 1992 models, GM redesigned its large SUVs, moving to the GMT400 architecture that had debuted for GM's 1988 pickup lines. Dimensions grew modestly with a  wheelbase and  length overall. The Chevrolet was now called the Full-Size Blazer, dropping the 'K5' prefix. The GMC Jimmy was renamed, and straightaway launched as the first generation GMC Yukon, while the smaller S15 Jimmy dropped the prefix and was named the 'Jimmy' from then on. Unlike prior generations, the GMT400-based Blazer/Yukon did not have a removable roof, and the tailgate glass was fixed. The Blazer was named "Four Wheeler of the Year" in 1992 by Four Wheeler magazine.

The standard engine remained the  small-block V8 with throttle-body fuel injection. The diesel engine was available only with a four-speed automatic transmission. All versions were fitted with an independent front suspension and solid rear axle with leaf springs; four-wheel drive versions had torsion springs in front, while two-wheel drive versions had coil springs.

In 1995, the Blazer nameplate was discontinued for the full-size vehicle; it was renamed and relaunched as the new 1995 Chevrolet Tahoe. The 1995 Tahoe/Yukon also included a longer wheelbase, four-door wagon body style which was smaller than the Suburban but larger than the two-door Tahoe. From then on, the Tahoe and Yukon models were offered in two sizes, as two- and four-doors. At the same time, Chevrolet rebranded their 2nd generation successor to the S-10 Blazer, and the Blazer name was transferred to it as Chevy's 'all-new Blazer' (and GMC Jimmy); the smaller Blazer/Jimmy vehicles were sold from 1995 to 2005, while the first-generation Tahoe/Yukon were replaced in 2000.

Variants and special models

M1009

Around 1976, a prototype K5 Blazer  was used as a testbed for a military CUCV vehicle built by Vic Hickey, father of the HUMVEE. Between 1983 and 1987, what is known as the M1009 CUCV was the production militarized version of the civilian K5. The differences are the lack of an air conditioner, an additional leaf spring in the suspension, a hybrid 12/24 V electrical system (described in detail below), blackout headlights, front mounted brush guard, a rifle rack, and special paint jobs. A majority of them are painted olive drab green or in the woodland camouflage pattern, though some vehicles that saw desert use were painted tan. All M1009s, including its derivatives, are powered with the 6.2 L Diesel power plant.

The M1009s have a split 24/12 V electrical system. Most of the truck actually runs on 12 V. It has two separate 12 V alternators and batteries wired in series, only the glow plug system, injection pump, the starter, and the jumper cable jack are wired to the 24 V terminals. everything else in the truck runs on 12 V. The glow plugs are actually 12 V glow plugs with a resistor pack on the firewall to drop the 24 V down to 12 V. This resistor pack can be bypassed and the glow plugs run directly off of the 12 V battery. If this is done and the 24 V starter is replaced with a standard 12v starter, the second alternator is no longer needed. (If this is done then the military 24 V slave adapter in the grille will need to be disconnected as well.)

Some decommissioned M1009s end up in law enforcement use (e.g. with the Los Angeles County Sheriff's Department) or sold through government auctions, but a handful are still in use by the National Guard.

1976–77 Chalet / Casa Grande

In 1976, GM collaborated with recreational vehicle manufacturer Chinook Mobilodge to offer modified versions of the Blazer and Jimmy with a permanently-fixed popup truck camper unit. Approximately 1,800 Blazer Chalet and Jimmy Casa Grande vehicles were built over two years of production. The integrated camper allows occupants to walk through from the cab to the rear living quarters.

1993–97 Yukon GT

The Yukon GT was introduced in 1993 as a sport-appearance trim variant of the third generation GMC Yukon (previously Jimmy) as a "Sport Equipment Package", option code BYP. It is equipped with four-wheel-drive and aluminum wheels; the GT package was available exclusively with the 350 in3 (5.7L) L05 V8. A 5-speed manual transmission is standard, but the automatic transmission can be selected. Visually, the GT was rendered in a monochromatic color scheme by painting the grille, bumpers, trim, and fender flares the same color as the body, which was available in black or dark garnet. It matched the appearance of the contemporaneously marketed high-performance GMC Syclone truck and Typhoon SUV, but unlike the smaller vehicles, the Yukon GT did not have any special engine tuning.

1977 K5 Blazer-E
At the 2020 SEMA show, Chevrolet Performance exhibited a electromod 1977 K5 Blazer-E equipped with the "Electric Connect and Cruise" (aka eCrate) package, which is the powertrain from the Chevrolet Bolt EV repackaged and sold commercially as a kit to convert conventionally-powered cars to electric vehicles. The K5 Blazer-E followed the Chevrolet E-10 Concept, a similar "electromod" restoration and electrification project that converted a 1962 C-10 pickup with a Bolt-derived EV powertrain, shown at SEMA 2019. Other "electromod" restorations with EV powertrains that followed the K5 Blazer-E include the 2021 Hyundai Heritage Series and 2021 Ford F-100 Eluminator. 

The Blazer-E retains its original driveshafts, axles, and transfer case, and uses a more powerful  Bolt traction motor instead of the 400 cu.in. V8, which had an estimated output of  using modern ratings. The Bolt's 60 kW-hr battery pack is bolted into the cargo area of the K5 Blazer-E. Aftermarket components were used to add power steering, generate vacuum for the vintage braking system, and control the gauges, with the fuel gauge converted to indicate state of charge instead.

"Retro Tahoe" K5 Blazer homage 
For the 2019 SEMA show, a customized 2018 Chevrolet Tahoe was restyled by Flat Out Autos as an homage to the first generation K5 Blazer. Dubbed the "Retro Tahoe", it was built to honor the Blazer's 50th anniversary. Steps to complete the customization include replacement of the stock exterior sheetmetal, a carbon fiber rear hatch, and machined aluminum door handles; four were built for members of the Abu Dhabi royal family. The following year, the same shop showed a modified two-door K5 Blazer homage using a sectioned Tahoe chassis.

References

External links

 
  (Blazer content starts at 9:56)
 
 
 

All-wheel-drive vehicles
K5 Blazer
Rear-wheel-drive vehicles
Full-size sport utility vehicles
1970s cars
1980s cars
1990s cars
Cars introduced in 1969
Motor vehicles manufactured in the United States